Chilhowee has a number of meanings:

 Chilhowee (Cherokee town), an ancient Cherokee village in Blount County and Monroe County, Tennessee
 Chilhowee Dam, a reservoir and dam development project in Tennessee
 Chilhowee Gliderport, privately owned public-use airport
 Chilhowee Group, a rock formation
 Chilhowee Mountain
 Chilhowee, Missouri, a town
 Chilhowee Park, a park in Knoxville, Tennessee
 Chilhowee Park (neighborhood), a neighborhood in Knoxville, Tennessee
 Chilhowie, Virginia, a town